In enzymology, an ethanolamine-phosphate cytidylyltransferase is an enzyme that catalyzes the chemical reaction

CTP + ethanolamine phosphate  diphosphate + CDP-ethanolamine

Thus, the two substrates of this enzyme are CTP and ethanolamine phosphate, whereas its two products are diphosphate and CDP-ethanolamine.

This enzyme belongs to the family of transferases, specifically those transferring phosphorus-containing nucleotide groups (nucleotidyltransferases).  The systematic name of this enzyme class is CTP:ethanolamine-phosphate cytidylyltransferase. Other names in common use include phosphorylethanolamine transferase, ET, CTP-phosphoethanolamine cytidylyltransferase, phosphoethanolamine cytidylyltransferase, and ethanolamine phosphate cytidylyltransferase.  This enzyme participates in aminophosphonate metabolism and glycerophospholipid metabolism.

References

 
 
 

EC 2.7.7
Enzymes of unknown structure